This is a list of German language place names in Poland, now exonyms for towns and villages in the Greater Poland Voivodeship.

See also 
 List of German exonyms for places in Poland

 G
Greater Poland